"I Saw an Angel Die" is a song written and performed by American singer-songwriter Bobbie Gentry. It was released on September 11, 1967, as the second single from her debut album Ode to Billie Joe. The song was produced by Kelly Gordon and features a string arrangement by Jimmie Haskell.

Commercial performance
The single was released in September 1967 following the success of Gentry's debut single "Ode to Billie Joe". Surprisingly, the single failed to chart.

Track listing
Capitol 5992
I Saw an Angel Die (Bobbie Gentry) – 2:56
Papa, Woncha Let Me Go to Town with You (Gentry) – 2:30

Personnel
Adapted from the single liner notes.
Bobbie Gentry – vocals, guitar
Kelly Gordon – producer
Jimmie Haskell – string arrangement, string conductor

References

1967 singles
Bobbie Gentry songs